Allium bidentatum is an Asian species of Allium in the amaryllis family. It is native to Mongolia, Russia (Buryatiya, Zabaykalsky Krai, Krasnoyarsk, Primorye), Kazakhstan, and northern China (Hebei, Heilongjiang, Jilin, Liaoning, Inner Mongolia, Shanxi, Xinjiang ). It grows in well-lit places, sometimes in saline soil.

Allium bidentatum produces very narrow cylindrical bulbs rarely more than 4 mm across. Scape is round in cross-section, up to 30 cm tall. Leaves are more or less round in cross-section, up to 15 cm long. Umbel is hemispherical, with red or red-violet flowers.

Two varieties are recognized.
 Allium bidentatum var. bidentatum - most of species range
 Allium bidentatum var. qinggouense Tolgor & Y.T.Zhao - Inner Mongolia

References

bidentatum
Onions
Flora of temperate Asia
Plants described in 1929